

The Codex Leicester (also briefly known as the Codex Hammer) is a collection of scientific writings by Leonardo da Vinci. The Codex is named after Thomas Coke, who purchased it in 1717; he later became the Earl of Leicester.

The Codex provides an insight into the inquiring mind of the definitive Renaissance artist, scientist and thinker, as well as an exceptional illustration of the link between art and science and the creativity of the scientific process.

Overview
The notebook is leather-bound and consists of 36 sheets 29 × 22 cm in size. The manuscript does not take the form of a single linear script, but is rather a mixture of Leonardo's observations and theories on astronomy; the properties of water, rocks, and fossils; air, and celestial light. The topics addressed include:

 An explanation of why fossils of sea creatures can be found on mountains. Hundreds of years before plate tectonics became accepted scientific theory, Leonardo believed that mountains had previously formed sea beds, which were gradually lifted until they formed mountains.
 The movement of water. This is the main topic of the Codex Leicester. Among other things, Leonardo wrote about the flow of water in rivers, and how it is affected by different obstacles put in its way. From his observations he made recommendations about bridge construction and erosion.
 The luminosity of the Moon. Leonardo speculated that the Moon's surface is covered by water, which reflects light from the Sun. In this model, waves on the water's surface cause the light to be reflected in many directions, explaining why the Moon is not as bright as the Sun. Leonardo explained that the pale glow on the dark portion of the crescent Moon is caused by sunlight reflected from the Earth. Thus, he described the phenomenon of planetshine one hundred years before the German astronomer Johannes Kepler proved it.

The Codex consists of 18 sheets of paper, each folded in half and written on both sides, forming the complete 72-page document. At one time the sheets were bound together, but they are now displayed separately. It was handwritten in Italian by Leonardo, using his characteristic mirror writing, and supported by copious drawings and diagrams.

Renamings
The Codex was purchased at auction from the Leicester estate in 1980 by the wealthy industrialist and art collector Armand Hammer, for $5.1 million ($ in ); he later renamed the notebook the Codex Hammer. Hammer commissioned Leonardo da Vinci scholar Carlo Pedretti to compile the loose pages of the codex back into its original form. Over the next seven years Pedretti translated each page to English, completing the project in 1987.

Recent history
After Gates acquired the Codex, he had its pages scanned into digital image files, some of which were later distributed as screen saver and wallpaper files on a CD-ROM as part of a Microsoft Plus! for Windows 95 desktop theme, which would later be included with Windows 98 and Windows ME. A comprehensive CD-ROM version (simply titled Leonardo da Vinci) was released by Corbis in 1997.

The Codex Leicester has been unbound with each page individually mounted between glass panes. It is put on public display once a year in a different city around the world. In 2000, it was displayed at Sydney's Powerhouse Museum. In 2004, it was exhibited in the Château de Chambord, and in 2005 in Tokyo. One page was exhibited at the Seattle Museum of Flight's 2006 exhibit Leonardo da Vinci: Man, Inventor, Genius. From June to August 2007, the Codex was the centerpiece of a two-month exhibition hosted by the Chester Beatty Library in Dublin, Ireland. The Codex was on view at the Phoenix Art Museum in Phoenix, Arizona from 24 January 2015 through 12 April 2015 for the exhibition Leonardo Da Vinci's Codex Leicester and the Power of Observation. Its presentation at Phoenix Art Museum was the first time a work by Leonardo was displayed in Arizona. The Codex was then on view at the Minneapolis Institute of Arts in an exhibition Leonardo Da Vinci, the Codex Leicester, and the Creative Mind that opened 21 June 2015, where it remained on display until 30 August 2015. As part of the same tour, the Codex Leicester was also on display at the North Carolina Museum of Art in Raleigh, North Carolina from 31 October 2015 to 17 January 2016.

For the 500th anniversary of da Vinci's death, the Codex Leicester was on display from 29 October 2018 to 20 January 2019 in Florence at the Aula Magliabechiana of the Uffizi.

Owners 
 Guglielmo della Porta, Michelangelo's student (?)
 Giuseppe Ghezzi (until 1719)
 Thomas Coke, 1st Earl of Leicester (1719–1759)
 Leicester estate (1759–1980)
 Armand Hammer (1980–1990)
 Estate of Armand Hammer (1990–1994)
 Bill Gates (1994–present)

See also 
 Codex Atlanticus
 Codex Arundel
 List of most expensive books and manuscripts
 Shahnameh of Shah Tahmasp

References

Further reading 
 
 . Sale catalogue, held on Friday 12 December 1980.
  volume 2: . A reprint of the original 1883 edition.

External links

 Da Vinci Codex Leicester's Guide
 Seattle P-I site for 1997 Seattle Art Museum exhibit of the Codex, including background info 
 News report of Japan opening, September 2005
 Leonardo da Vinci: The Codex Leicester
 Chester Beatty Library, Dublin, Ireland
 The sale of the Codex Hammer, 11 November 1994
 Water as Microscope of Nature: Leonardo da Vinci's Codex Leicester, exhibition in Florence, Uffizi Galleries

16th-century books
Bill Gates
Codices by Leonardo da Vinci
Scientific illuminated manuscripts

ja:レオナルド・ダ・ヴィンチ手稿